Matthew Thomas Ritchie (born 10 September 1989) is a professional footballer who plays as a winger for Premier League club Newcastle United. Ritchie represented the Scotland national team from 2015 to 2018. Prior to joining Newcastle United in 2016, he played for Portsmouth, Swindon Town and Bournemouth.

Although born and raised in England, Ritchie qualified to play for Scotland through his Scottish father. He made his senior international debut on 25 March 2015, in a friendly match against Northern Ireland.

Club career

Portsmouth
Ritchie had been involved in Portsmouth's academy since he turned 13, previously playing football locally in Gosport, starting at the age of six. After signing his first professional contract with the club, and a positive 2008–09 pre-season campaign, including a hat-trick in a 4–1 victory over hometown club Gosport Borough, after the match, Ritchie said scoring a hat-trick was 'unreal'.

He went on loan to Swindon Town in 2010 but due to Portsmouth's mounting injury list, he was recalled in March and was named on the bench for their 2–0 Premier League loss at the hands of Tottenham Hotspur after making four appearances for Swindon. On 14 April, he made his League debut for Portsmouth in the game against Wigan Athletic. He played 79 minutes but was then substituted for Frédéric Piquionne. After the match, Ritchie admits making his Portsmouth debut was a dream come true. At the end of the season, with Portsmouth's relegation from the Premier League confirmed, he signed a new two-year deal.

For the 2010–11 season, Ritchie was handed the number 5 shirt and was selected in Portsmouth's starting XI for their first match of the season at Coventry City. However, he soon found himself out of the Portsmouth line-up and, with the club having disbanded its reserve team, manager Steve Cotterill agreed to loan out the player for fitness reasons.

Loan to Dagenham & Redbridge
Ritchie played reserve and academy football at Pompey until late September and continued to impress until he was taken on a one-month loan deal by League Two club Dagenham & Redbridge. He made his Football League debut against Rotherham United on 27 September 2008, coming on as a late substitute. Ritchie scored on his first competitive start for the Daggers in a 2–0 win over Rochdale. He scored again in his next match, a 2–0 win over Barnet.

Ritchie also made clear his wishes to extend the loan deal until the end of the season. Dagenham announced on 30 December that the player would remain with the club until the end of the current season. His impressive performances saw him rewarded with a new two-year deal at Portsmouth, and their Young Player of the Season Award.

Loan to Notts County
On 28 July 2009, it was reported that Notts County, were in talks with Portsmouth over a six-figure fee for his services, believed to be £100,000. On 1 September 2009, Ritchie signed on loan until 31 December, although County wanted to extend his loan deal.

Loan to Swindon and permanent basis
After Danny Wilson failed to secure Ritchie's services on a permanent deal during the transfer window, it was announced on 11 February 2010 that Swindon Town had signed the midfielder on loan for the remainder of the season. He made his debut on 23 February against Stockport County after coming on for Danny Ward after 25 minutes.

After making a brief appearance for Pompey on 4 October, Ritchie was loaned again to Swindon Town, on a one-month deal. Two weeks later the deal was extended to two months.

On 7 January 2011, Swindon Town signed Ritchie on a two-and-a-half-year deal for an undisclosed fee. He added to his tally with goals against Bournemouth in a 3–2 loss, a 4–1 loss to Southampton, a 1–1 draw with Hartlepool United and a 2–1 loss against Notts County. Despite Swindon Town being relegated to League Two, Ritchie was named the Robins' Player of the Season.

Under manager Paolo Di Canio in League Two, he retained his first team place in the starting eleven and scoring form with ten goals that season. During the season, Ritchie was linked with League One clubs, with the likes of Bournemouth interested in signing the player. After Bournemouth's bid for him was rejected, manager Di Canio said that he was worth about £2 million.
In March, he won the Football League Two Player of the Year for 2012. With teammate Paul Caddis he was named in the PFA League Two Team of the Year.

Ahead of a new season in League One, Swindon turned down a £900,000 offer from a League One club for Ritchie, insisting he would be sold for £2.5 million. Shortly afterwards he signed a new contract, keeping him at the club until 2014.

AFC Bournemouth
On 30 January 2013, Ritchie signed for Bournemouth on a three-and-a-half-year deal for £400,000. After leaving Swindon Town, he said that he was surprised to leave the club and that he had left with a "heavy heart". However, Di Canio claimed that the club sold Ritchie behind his back.

He made his debut on 2 February in a 3–0 win over Milton Keynes Dons. Ritchie scored his first goal for his new team on 23 March in a 4–1 win over Bury. That win was the first of an eight match run of successive wins, including a brace for Ritchie in a 3–1 victory over Notts County, that culminated in clinching promotion to the Championship.

He was a key performer for Bournemouth during the 2014–15 season. His form helped the side to top the Championship and won him international recognition with Scotland. By April, he had scored 11 goals and provided 13 assists for his team. Ritchie's form saw him voted the Football League's best player in a poll by FourFourTwo magazine.

On 19 September 2015, he scored his first ever goal in the Premier League, coming on for Bournemouth in a 2–0 home win against Sunderland. On 25 October 2015, Ritchie scored his team's only goal of the game after just one minute, in Bournemouth's 5–1 drubbing by Tottenham Hotspur.

Newcastle United

On 1 July 2016, Ritchie signed a five-year contract with newly relegated Newcastle United, becoming the third signing under manager Rafael Benítez. He made his debut for the club in a 1–0 loss to Fulham, playing the full 90 minutes. His first goal, a penalty, came two matches later in a 4–1 win over Reading. From then on, Ritchie would become the club's designated penalty taker and had a 100% success rate in all competitions, converting from the spot five times. He was involved in two penalty related incidents over the course of the season. On 25 October, he refused to hand the ball to Aleksandar Mitrović, tucking it under his shirt, before scoring the third goal in a 6–0 win over Preston North End. On 5 April 2017, against Burton Albion, Ritchie scored a penalty, but it was not awarded due to encroachment by Dwight Gayle. However, referee Keith Stroud awarded a direct free kick to Burton, rather than allowing Ritchie to retake the penalty. Ultimately, it did not matter as he scored the winner anyway, to keep Newcastle in the promotion hunt. Ritchie's season was ended by suspension, when he argued with a match official after a home draw with Leeds United. Ritchie scored sixteen goals in all competitions, with only Gayle having netted more than the Scotsman.

On 26 August, Ritchie assisted Ciaran Clark for the second goal of the match, as Newcastle got their first win of the season, beating West Ham United 3–0. He was then credited with the assists for the goals scored by Jamaal Lascelles and Christian Atsu in wins over Swansea City and Stoke City. On 28 November, he assisted both Newcastle goals from set-pieces in a 2–2 draw with West Bromwich Albion. In the second half of the season, Ritchie scored three times, all in home wins over Manchester United, Southampton and Arsenal.

On 11 August 2018, Ritchie set up Joselu for the equaliser, in a 2–1 home loss to Tottenham Hotspur. He was taken off in the second half, much to his disapproval; his emotional outburst on the bench was captured on television cameras.

In August 2019, he injured his ankle and was expected to be out of action for two months.

In 2019–20, Ritchie celebrated goals by assertively kicking the corner flag. On 18 January 2020, while celebrating Isaac Hayden's match winning injury time goal against Chelsea, Ritchie, following tradition, kicked a corner flag and the flag landed into a fans groin.

International career
Under FIFA eligibility rules, Ritchie was eligible for the national teams of England, where he was born and raised, and Scotland, his father's native land. On 16 March 2015, he was called up to the Scotland national football team for a friendly against Northern Ireland and a UEFA Euro 2016 qualifier against Gibraltar. Ritchie made his debut against Northern Ireland on 25 March at Hampden Park, and took the 85th-minute corner which set up Christophe Berra's header for the only goal of the game. On 5 June he scored his first international goal, a 20-yard strike which was the only goal of a friendly victory over Qatar at Easter Road in Edinburgh. His second goal came in a European Championship qualifier against Poland at Hampden Park on 8 October 2015, for which he won "Goal of the Year" award from the Scottish FA.

After being involved consistently for Scotland until the end of 2016, Ritchie withdrew from several subsequent squads due to injuries – either unable to play at all, precautions over recurrence or having to rest during international breaks to improve his condition – appearing just once in 2017 and once in 2018. In November 2018, he requested not to be considered for selection for the 'foreseeable future' for reasons not disclosed by Scotland manager Alex McLeish.

Career statistics

Club

International

International goals
As of match played 29 March 2016. Scotland score listed first, score column indicates score after each Ritchie goal.

Honours
Swindon Town
Football League Two: 2011–12

AFC Bournemouth
Football League Championship: 2014–15

Newcastle United
EFL Championship: 2016–17
EFL Cup runner-up: 2022–23

Individual
Football League Two Player of the Year: 2011–12
Football League One Player of the Year: 2012–13
PFA Team of the Year: 2011–12 League Two, 2012–13 League One 2014–15 Championship
SFWA International Player of the Year: 2015–16
North-East FWA Player of the Year: 2017

See also
 List of Scotland international footballers born outside Scotland

References

External links

1989 births
Living people
People from Gosport
English footballers
Scottish footballers
Scotland international footballers
Association football wingers
Portsmouth F.C. players
Dagenham & Redbridge F.C. players
Notts County F.C. players
Swindon Town F.C. players
AFC Bournemouth players
Newcastle United F.C. players
English Football League players
Premier League players
English people of Scottish descent